Kemal Mehmood Homoud (born December 26, 1921) was a Jordanian ambassador.

Career
From 1941 to 1950 he served as officer in Royal Jordanian Army.
From 1946 to 1950 he was military attaché in London.
In 1950 he joined the Jordanian diplomatic service.
From 1951 to 1952 he was employed in the Ministry of Foreign Affairs in Amman.
From 1952 to 1954 he was Chief of Protocol of the Royal Palace.
From 1954 to 1956 he was counselor in London.
From 1957 to 1962 he was Chargé d'affaires in Santiago de Chile.
In 1962 he was Chargé d'affaires in Tehran, Iran.
From 1960 to 1964 he was Chief of Protocol of the Ministry of Foreign Affairs.
From  to 1968 he was ambassador in New Delhi with concurrent accreditation in Colombo, (Sri Lanka), Bangkok, (Thailand) and Malaysia.
From  to 1971 he was ambassador in Baghdad, Iraq.
From 1971 to 1972 he was head of Political Department, Ministry of Foreign Affairs.
In 1972 he was acting secretary general at the Foreign Ministry.
From 1972 to 1973 he was ambassador to the Arab League.
From  to 1977 he was ambassador in Moscow, in the Soviet Union.
From 1977 to February 1979 he was secretary general of the Foreign Ministry.
From February 1979 to 1987 he was ambassador in Beijing, the People's Republic of China.
In 1987 he retired.

References

1921 births
Possibly living people
Ambassadors of Jordan to Chile
Ambassadors of Jordan to Iran
Ambassadors of Jordan to Iraq
Ambassadors of Jordan to India
Ambassadors of Jordan to Egypt
Ambassadors of Jordan to Russia
Ambassadors of Jordan to China
Jordanian Chief of Protocol
Jordanian expatriates in the United Kingdom